Josef Pioner was an Italian luger who competed in the late 1970s. A natural track luger, he won two medals in the men's doubles event at the FIL European Luge Natural Track Championships with a silver in 1978 and a bronze in 1977.

References
Natural track European Championships results 1970-2006.

Italian male lugers
Italian lugers
Year of birth missing (living people)
Living people
Missing middle or first names
Sportspeople from Südtirol